Caroline "Kitty" Kenney (1880 – 1952) was a sister of Annie Kenney, one of the most well-known British suffragettes to go on hunger strike, for whom the Blathwayts planted commemorative trees in their Eagle House garden in Batheaston, Somerset.
Another sister, Jessie, was abroad when her involvement in explosives was discovered by the authorities.

Biography 
Caroline (Kitty) was the sixth child of 12 siblings, 11 of whom survived infancy, and one of the seven daughters of Horatio Nelson Kenney (1849–1912) and Anne Wood (1852–1905). Her sisters included Sarah (Nell), Ann (Annie), Jessica (Jessie), Alice and Jane (Jennie). Annie and Jessie took leading roles in the Women's Social and Political Union. Kitty and Jennie had been trained by Maria Montessori. They were employed; they ran a recovery centre for suffragettes in Kensington at a gothic pile known as Tower Cressy. The suffragettes needed to convalesce after they had been imprisoned and force-fed.

Suffragette's Rest 

In August 1909 Kitty was first invited to Eagle House, home of the Blathwayts and also known as the Suffragette's Rest,  to join her two sisters.

During the summer of 1910, Kitty and her sister Jennie, who were both teachers, joined Annie at Eagle House to recuperate from illness. Both had surgery and further nursing care from the Blathwayts and remained at Batheaston for some months.

Kitty Kenney had been given a Hunger Strike Medal 'for Valour' by WSPU.

America
In 1916 the Lenox School, a primary school to prepare girls to enter the Finch School, was founded in New York. The Lenox School employed Kitty and Jennie Kenney as joint heads until they retired in 1929. 

Kitty moved to Philadelphia and then finally to California. She died in 1952.

See also 
 Women's suffrage in the United Kingdom

References 

1880 births
1952 deaths
Women's Social and Political Union
Hunger Strike Medal recipients